Chandrika Bindu (Sanskrit:चन्द्रिका बिंदु),  is a Sanskrit work on Dvaita philosophy written by Satyapriya Tirtha. It is a lucid adaptation of the well-known commentary on Vyasatirthas Tatparya Chandrika or Chandrika, which is a commentary on Tattva Prakasika by Jayatirtha, which in turn is a commentary on Madhva's Brahma Sutra Bhashya.

References

Dvaita Vedanta
Philosophical literature
Sanskrit texts